Alcimedon (Ancient Greek: Ἀλκιμέδων) can refer to a number of people in Greek mythology and history:

 Alcimedon, one of the Tyrrhenian sailors, who wanted to carry off the infant Dionysus from Naxos, but was metamorphosed, with his companions, into a dolphin.
Alcimedon, an Arcadian hero, from whom the Arcadian plain Alcimedon derived its name. He lived in a place near Mount Ostracina and had a daughter named Phialo, by whom Heracles had a son, Aechmagoras. Alcimedon exposed the latter but was Heracles saved.
 Alcimedon, a son of Laerceus, and one of the commanders of the Myrmidons under Patroclus.

Notes

References 

 Gaius Julius Hyginus, Fabulae from The Myths of Hyginus translated and edited by Mary Grant. University of Kansas Publications in Humanistic Studies. Online version at the Topos Text Project.
 Homer, The Iliad with an English Translation by A.T. Murray, Ph.D. in two volumes. Cambridge, MA., Harvard University Press; London, William Heinemann, Ltd. 1924. . Online version at the Perseus Digital Library.
Homer, Homeri Opera in five volumes. Oxford, Oxford University Press. 1920. . Greek text available at the Perseus Digital Library.
 Pausanias, Description of Greece with an English Translation by W.H.S. Jones, Litt.D., and H.A. Ormerod, M.A., in 4 Volumes. Cambridge, MA, Harvard University Press; London, William Heinemann Ltd. 1918. . Online version at the Perseus Digital Library
Pausanias, Graeciae Descriptio. 3 vols. Leipzig, Teubner. 1903.  Greek text available at the Perseus Digital Library.
 Publius Ovidius Naso, Metamorphoses translated by Brookes More (1859-1942). Boston, Cornhill Publishing Co. 1922. Online version at the Perseus Digital Library.
 Publius Ovidius Naso, Metamorphoses. Hugo Magnus. Gotha (Germany). Friedr. Andr. Perthes. 1892. Latin text available at the Perseus Digital Library.
 Quintus Smyrnaeus, The Fall of Troy translated by Way. A. S. Loeb Classical Library Volume 19. London: William Heinemann, 1913. Online version at theio.com
 Quintus Smyrnaeus, The Fall of Troy. Arthur S. Way. London: William Heinemann; New York: G.P. Putnam's Sons. 1913. Greek text available at the Perseus Digital Library.

Achaeans (Homer)
People of the Trojan War
Dionysus in mythology
Mythology of Heracles
Metamorphoses into animals in Greek mythology